WEC 25: McCullough vs. Cope was the first mixed martial arts event held by the World Extreme Cagefighting under Zuffa management. The event was held on January 20, 2007. WEC 25s main event was a championship fight for the vacant WEC Lightweight Title, between rivals Rob McCullough and Kit Cope. The co-main event was a WEC Featherweight Title bout between champion, Urijah Faber and challenger Joe Pearson.

A WEC Light Heavyweight Title bout was originally advertised between champion Doug Marshall and Jorge Oliveira, but the bout was later pulled from the card. Marshall would instead make his first title defense against Justin McElfresh at WEC 27 in May 2007.

Results

Reported Payout
The following is the reported payout to the fighters as reported to the Nevada State Athletic Commission. It does not include sponsor money or "locker room" bonuses often given by the WEC.Rob McCullough: $20,000 (includes $10,000 win bonus) def. Kit Cope: $5,000Urijah Faber: $10,000 ($5,000 win bonus) def. Joe Pearson: $4,000John Alessio: $10,000 ($4,000 win bonus) def. Brian Gassaway: $4,000Logan Clark: $12,000 ($6,000 win bonus) def. Blas Avena: $2,500Brendan Seguin: $4,000 ($2,000 win bonus) def. Fernando Gonzalez: $3,000Alex Karalexis: $8,000 ($4,000 win bonus) def. Olaf Alfanso: $4,000Carlos Condit: $8,000 ($4,000 win bonus) def. Kyle Jensen: $3,000Antonio Banuelos: $6,000 ($3,000 win bonus) def. Mike French: $3,000Rich Crunkilton:' $10,000 ($5,000 win bonus) def. Mike Joy: $2,000

Miscelleaneous
 First WEC show under Zuffa management.
 The WEC Lightweight Title was previously held by Hermes Franca, who had to vacate it in order to continue to compete in the UFC

See also 
 World Extreme Cagefighting
 List of WEC champions
 List of WEC events
 2007 in WEC

References

External links
Event Results on Sherdog
Official WEC website
WEC Las Vegas debüt a Success

World Extreme Cagefighting events
2007 in mixed martial arts
Mixed martial arts in Las Vegas
2007 in sports in Nevada
Hard Rock Hotel and Casino (Las Vegas)